Don Zimmerman may refer to:

Sports
 Don Zimmerman (wide receiver) (1949–2020), American professional wide receiver in the National Football League
 Don Zimmerman (halfback) (1913–1974), All-American college football player for Tulane University
 Don Zimmerman (lacrosse) (born 1953), American lacrosse coach

Other people
 Don Zimmerman (film editor), American film editor
 Don Z. Zimmerman (1903–1983), US Air Force general

See also
 Don Zimmer (1931–2014), American baseball player and manager
 Donald Zimmerman (born 1931), Kansas state legislator